Norrmejerier is a Swedish dairy company. Norrmejerier was formed in 1971 when the Västerbottens Södra Mejeriförening, Skellefteortens mejeriförening and Lappmarkens mejeriförening were combined. Norrbottens läns producentförening was incorporated in 1992. Norrmejerier is the sole producer of Västerbotten cheese.

References and notes

External links
Norrmejerier

Food and drink companies of Sweden
Food and drink companies established in 1971
Companies based in Västerbotten County